Toni Tasev (born 25 March 1994) is a Bulgarian professional footballer who plays as a winger for Slavia Sofia.

Career

Pirin
Born in Blagoevgrad, Tasev is a product of the Pirin 2001 academy. On 30 August 2013, he joined Pirin Blagoevgrad and made his senior debut two days later, coming on as a substitute against Velbazhd Kyustendil at Osogovo Stadium in a game of the third division. Tasev scored his first goal in a 3–0 away win over Sportist Svoge on 29 September.

Botev Plovdiv
On 7 June 2017, Tasev signed a 2-year contract with Botev Plovdiv as a free agent. On 29 June Tasev made an official debut for Botev Plovdiv during the 3-1 away win over Partizani Tirana in the 1st qualifying round of UEFA Europa League. On 6 June 2018, Tasev, who had been on loan at Montana during the spring, was released from Botev Plovdiv.

Montana
On 19 June 2018, Tasev signed with Montana.

International career
On 7 March 2016, Tasev was called up for the first time to the Bulgarian national team for the friendly matches against Portugal and against Macedonia, but did not debut.

Career statistics

Club

Honours

Club
Botev Plovdiv
Bulgarian Supercup: 2017

References

External links
 

1994 births
Living people
Sportspeople from Blagoevgrad
Bulgarian footballers
Bulgaria under-21 international footballers
First Professional Football League (Bulgaria) players
Second Professional Football League (Bulgaria) players
Association football wingers
OFC Pirin Blagoevgrad players
Botev Plovdiv players
FC Montana players